Brisa Bruggesser (born 25 July 2002) is an Argentinian field hockey player.

Hockey career 
In 2019, Bruggesser was called into the senior national women's team.

She won a gold medal at the 2018 Youth Olympics in Buenos Aires.

References

External links

Living people
2001 births
Argentine female field hockey players
Field hockey players at the 2018 Summer Youth Olympics
People from Tandil
Youth Olympic gold medalists for Argentina
Sportspeople from Buenos Aires Province